Monaco national rugby union team has been playing since the 1990s. They currently only play friendly games and do not compete in the European Nations Cup, but they are still member of World Rugby. In October 2019, Monaco ranked 101st out of 105 national teams according to World Rugby.

History
Monaco made their international debut in July 1996, in a match against Luxembourg, which ended in an 8-all draw. The next match played by Monaco was in April of the following year, when they also recorded their first win, defeating Slovenia 23-17. Monaco then played a number of games in the late 1990s, and then won three games in 2002. However, in 2006, they defeated Slovakia 6 points to nil. Monaco competed in the European qualifying tournament for the 2003 Rugby World Cup.

Record

World Cup

Overall

See also
 Fédération Monégasque de Rugby
 Rugby union in Monaco

External links
 Monaco-Rugby.com
 Monaco on IRB.com
 Monaco on rugbydata.com

References

Rugby union in Monaco
European national rugby union teams
Teams in European Nations Cup (rugby union)
National sports teams of Monaco